Decanal is an organic compound classified as an aldehyde with the chemical formula C10H20O.

Occurrence 
Decanal occurs naturally in citrus, along with octanal, citral, and sinensal, in buckwheat,
and in coriander essential oil. It is used in fragrances and flavoring.

Preparation  
Decanal can be prepared by oxidation of the related alcohol decanol.

Safety
For safety information see the MSDS.

References

Fatty aldehydes
Sweet-smelling chemicals
Alkanals